The 1966–68 Liga Leumit season was the thirteenth in the league's history, and is notable for the Israel Football Association's decision to play it over two years as a play to combat corruption and increasing violence at matches. The sixteen teams played each other four times during the season, effectively combining two seasons into one, leading it to be known as the double season (HaOna HaKfula).

At the end of the season SK Nes Tziona and Hapoel Mahane Yehuda were relegated to Liga Alef, making it Mahane Yehuda's last top flight season to date. They were replaced by Hapoel Kfar Saba and Beitar Jerusalem. As champions, Maccabi Tel Aviv entered the 1969 Asian Club Championship, which they won. Maccabi Netanya's Mordechai Spiegler was the season's top scorer with 38 goals - 15 during 1966–67 and 23 in 1967–68.

Background
The season began with a protests from relegated players, with the uproar reaching as far as the Knesset. In an attempt to restore order to the game and solve the issues raised, the IFA decided to spread the league games over two years instead of one. The main objectives were to put an end to the riots on the field, reducing trouble at matches and improve the quality of play, as well as infusing new blood into teams by alleviating the immediate fear of relegation.

The double season format involved all the Maccabi (Haifa, Maccabi Jaffa, Netanya, Sha'arayim and Tel Aviv) and Hapoel (Be'er Sheva, Haifa, Jerusalem, Mahane Yehuda, Petah Tikva, Ramat Gan and Tel Aviv) teams playing amongst themselves at the start of the season, and only later playing between the two groups of clubs. This was aimed at minimising the possibilities for match-fixing by teams affiliated to the same organisation at the end of the season. However, despite the drastic solution of playing a double season, the objectives were not considered to have been achieved.

League table

Results

Rounds 1–30

Rounds 31–60

References

Liga Leumit seasons
Israel
1966–67 in Israeli football leagues
Israel
1967–68 in Israeli football leagues